Ben Keays (born 23 February 1997) is a professional Australian rules footballer playing for the Adelaide Football Club in the Australian Football League (AFL).

Early life
Born in Melbourne, Keays participated in the Auskick program at Hampton, Victoria. Keays moved to Brisbane at five years of age and continued playing Auskick at te Morningside Australian Football Club. He attended St Joseph's College, Gregory Terrace throughout his schooling years. His great grandfather, Fred, played football for Fitzroy and Collingwood between 1919-1922 and served in both World War I and II. His great uncle, Desmond, also played football for Fitzroy while his uncle, Terry, played for Collingwood and Richmond. Ben began playing junior football for the Morningside Panthers and was placed in the Brisbane Lions talent academy at the age of 14. He was selected to represent Queensland in the 2014 and 2015 AFL Under 18 Championships, and was selected in the 2014 and 2015 All-Australian teams. He also captained Queensland to their first division 2 title in nine years at the 2015 AFL Under 18 Championships and won the 2015 Hunter Harrison Medal for his performances across the three games.

Keays was recruited by the Brisbane Lions with their third selection and 24th overall in the 2015 national draft. He was the second academy selection for Brisbane after they matched a bid by the Western Bulldogs.

AFL career
Keays made his AFL debut for Brisbane in round 6, 2016 against the Sydney Swans. He won the Andrew Ireland Medal as best afield in the 2017 NEAFL Grand final, amassing 30 disposals, 9 tackles and 2 goals. He was delisted at the conclusion of the 2019 AFL season. Keays was later picked up by the Adelaide Crows at Pick 7 in the 2019 AFL Rookie Draft.

Keays enjoyed a breakout 2020 AFL season, playing 16 games for the Crows. He finished 5th in the Malcolm Blight Medal and won the Players Trademark award.

He received competition-wide recognition with an impressive 2021 AFL season which was rewarded with a 2nd place finish in the Malcolm Blight Medal.  Keays shocked the AFL with an elite disposal average of 28.1 throughout the home and away season, as well as polling 11 votes in the 2021 Brownlow Medal.  In October of 2021, he signed a contract which would keep him at the Crows until the end of 2024.

References

External links

Living people
1997 births
Australian rules footballers from Queensland
People educated at St Joseph's College, Gregory Terrace
Redland Football Club players
Morningside Australian Football Club players
Brisbane Lions players
Adelaide Football Club players
Sportspeople from Brisbane